Daughters Courageous is a 1939 American drama film starring John Garfield, Claude Rains, Jeffrey Lynn and featuring the Lane Sisters: Lola Lane, Rosemary Lane and Priscilla Lane. Based on the play Fly Away Home by Dorothy Bennett and Irving White, the film was directed by Michael Curtiz. It was released by Warner Bros. on June 23, 1939.

Plot
Freewheeling Jim Masters returns home after a 20-year absence, during which he was declared dead, to find that his wife, Nancy, is about to marry Sam Sloane, a stable local man in Carmel, California. She must now choose between her ex-husband and her new fiancé. The Masters daughters are also upset that their irresponsible father has re-entered their lives after so long an absence. Meanwhile, the youngest daughter, Buff, is drawn to tough-guy Gabriel Lopez, a man that reminds Jim Masters of himself.

Cast
 John Garfield as Gabriel Lopez
 Claude Rains as Jim Masters
 Jeffrey Lynn as Johnny Heming
 Fay Bainter as Nancy Masters
 Donald Crisp as Sam Sloane
 May Robson as Penny
 Frank McHugh as George
 Dick Foran as Eddie Moore
 Priscilla Lane as Buff Masters
 Rosemary Lane as Tinka Masters
 Lola Lane as Linda Masters
 Gale Page as Cora Masters
 George Humbert as Manuel Lopez
 Berton Churchill as Judge Henry Hornsby

'Four Daughters' film series
Daughters Courageous was made as a stand-alone film, and its characters do not appear in any other film. However, it has much in common with the "Four Daughters" film series of that era, with the same director, largely the same cast (including the Lane sisters) and many similarities in subject matter. The series consists of 1938's Four Daughters, the 1939 film Four Wives, and 1941's Four Mothers.

Reception
Frank S. Nugent of The New York Times called the film " a thoroughly pleasant entertainment—howbeit reminiscent—with a thoroughly pleasant cast to grace it." Variety wrote: "Few of the situations can stand up under too close scrutiny, but the flavor of the film as a whole is entertaining, amusing, and occasionally emotional." Harrison's Reports called it "Good entertainment ... Although it is not as impressive as 'Four Daughters,' it nevertheless holds one's attention well, since one is in sympathy with all the characters." Film Daily called it "A production with a high voltage of sentimental of romantic appeal" with a "super-duper" cast. John Mosher of The New Yorker wrote that Garfield added "a touch of color or adventuresome liveliness" to help along the story, but found "a quantity of bungalow patter that wears one down at times" and "a slight dullness" to the picture.

Home media
Warner Archive released the film on DVD on August 1, 2011. The film was also released by Warner Archive in the "Four Daughters Movie Series Collection".

References

External links
 
 
 
 

1939 films
American romantic drama films
American black-and-white films
1930s English-language films
Films directed by Michael Curtiz
American films based on plays
American sequel films
Warner Bros. films
Films produced by Henry Blanke
Films produced by Hal B. Wallis
Films scored by Max Steiner
Films with screenplays by Julius J. Epstein
Films with screenplays by Philip G. Epstein
1939 romantic drama films
1930s American films